In the Deep Woods is a 1992 American made-for-television crime thriller film starring Rosanna Arquette, Anthony Perkins, Will Patton and D.W. Moffett. It was directed by Charles Correll and premiered on NBC on October 26, 1992. The film marked the final film role of Perkins, who died a month before its realise.

Plot
Joanna Warren is a children's book author whose life unravels when a childhood friend is brutally murdered by the vicious Deep Woods Killer, a serial murderer preying upon successful career women. As Joanna is drawn deeper in a tangled web of violence and deceit, she becomes an unwitting pawn in a deadly game between the elusive killer and Paul Miller, an eerie private investigator with his own motives for solving the case.

Cast
Rosanna Arquette as Joanna Warren
Anthony Perkins as Paul Miller, P.I.
Will Patton as Eric Gaines
D.W. Moffett as Frank McCarry
Chris Rydell as Tommy Warren
Amy Ryan as Beth
Beth Broderick as Myra Cantrell
Harold Sylvester as George Dunaway
Kimberly Beck as Margot

Production
The film was shot on location in San Diego, California in March 1992.

References

External links

1992 television films
1992 films
1992 crime thriller films
American crime thriller films
1990s English-language films
NBC network original films
Films scored by Sylvester Levay
Films directed by Charles Correll
1990s American films